Following the suspension of the Northern Ireland Assembly in 2002 a new election was called in November 2003 in hope of restoring devolution, the election saw the Democratic Unionist Party (DUP) and Sinn Féin emerge as the largest parties in the Assembly. The DUP refused to go into government with Sinn Féin meaning that direct rule would stay in place for another 5 years.

Executive committee

See also 
List of Northern Ireland Executives
Members of the Northern Ireland Assembly elected in 2003

Northern Ireland Executive
Ministries of the Northern Ireland Assembly